Rittman is a city in Medina and Wayne counties in the U.S. state of Ohio. All but a small portion of the city is in Wayne County, within commuting distance of Akron, Canton and Cleveland. The population was 6,491 at the 2010 census.

Geography
Rittman is located at  (40.973376, -81.784416).

Demographics

2010 census
At the 2010 census there were 6,491 people, 2,547 households, and 1,763 families living in the city. The racial makeup of the city was 97.2% White, 0.4% African American, 0.2% Native American, 0.4% Asian, 0.2% from other races, and 1.6% from two or more races. Hispanic or Latino of any race were 1.2%.

Of the 2,547 households 33.5% had children under the age of 18 living with them, 51.6% were married couples living together, 11.9% had a female householder with no husband present, 5.8% had a male householder with no wife present, and 30.8% were non-families. 26.2% of households were one person and 10.8% were one person aged 65 or older. The average household size was 2.52 and the average family size was 3.01.

The median age was 38.5 years. 23.9% of residents were under the age of 18; 8% were between the ages of 18 and 24; 26.9% were from 25 to 44; 26.5% were from 45 to 64; and 14.7% were 65 or older. The gender makeup of the city was 48.9% male and 51.1% female.

2000 census
At the 2000 census there were 6,314 people, 2,424 households, and 1,711 families living in the city. The population density was 1,046.9 people per square mile (404.3/km). There were 2,518 housing units at an average density of 417.5 per square mile (161.2/km).  The racial makeup of the city was 98.13% White, 0.10% African American, 0.22% Native American, 0.38% Asian, 0.27% from other races, and 0.90% from two or more races. Hispanic or Latino of any race were 0.89%.

Of the 2,424 households 34.6% had children under the age of 18 living with them, 55.8% were married couples living together, 10.8% had a female householder with no husband present, and 29.4% were non-families. 25.5% of households were one person and 10.8% were one person aged 65 or older. The average household size was 2.57 and the average family size was 3.10.

The age distribution was 26.5% under the age of 18, 8.2% from 18 to 24, 31.7% from 25 to 44, 20.3% from 45 to 64, and 13.3% 65 or older. The median age was 36 years. For every 100 females, there were 95.2 males. For every 100 females age 18 and over, there were 92.1 males.

The median household income was $35,020 and the median family income  was $41,643. Males had a median income of $30,885 versus $23,708 for females. The per capita income for the city was $16,049. About 6.4% of families and 8.3% of the population were below the poverty line, including 11.8% of those under age 18 and 9.2% of those age 65 or over.

Education
Rittman High School, Rittman Middle School, and Rittman Elementary School are all part of the Rittman Exempted Village School District.

Rittman is served by a branch of the Wayne County Public Library.

References

External links
 City of Rittman

Cities in Medina County, Ohio
Cities in Wayne County, Ohio
Populated places established in 1814
Cities in Ohio